The WISPA World Series 2010 is a series of women's squash tournaments which are part of the Women's International Squash Players Association (WISPA) World Tour for the 2010 squash season. The WISPA World Series tournaments are some of the most prestigious events on the women's tour. Nicol David won the 2010 World Series followed by Jenny Duncalf and Rachael Grinham.

WSA World Series Ranking Points
WSA World Series events also have a separate World Series ranking. Points for this are calculated on a cumulative basis after each World Series event.

2010 Tournaments

World Series Standings 2010

See also
WISPA World Tour 2010
Official Women's Squash World Ranking

References

External links 
 WISPA Calendar website

WSA World Tour seasons
2010 in squash